Ben Dickey (born 1977) is an American actor and musician best known for playing Blaze Foley in the 2018 biographical drama Blaze.  For his performance in the film, Dickey won the Sundance Film Festival U.S. Dramatic Special Jury Award for Achievement in Acting.

Originally from Little Rock, Arkansas, Dickey now resides in Louisiana as of 2018.  In 2016, he released his first album Sexy Birds and Salt Water Classics.  In 2019, he released his second album A Glimmer On The Outskirts which was produced by his Blaze co-star Charlie Sexton.

Filmography
The Hottest State (2006)
Blaze (2018)
The Kid (2019)
The Last Movie Stars (2022)

References

External links
 

Living people
21st-century American male actors
American male film actors
1977 births
Male actors from Louisiana
Male actors from Arkansas
Male actors from Little Rock, Arkansas
Sundance Film Festival award winners